Bembe (Kibeembe) is a Bantu language of Congo-Brazzaville. It is closely related to Kikongo. Pangwa (not the Pangwa of Tanzania) may be a dialect.

Maho (2009) considers Beembe, Kamba-Doondo, and Hangala (Ghaangala) to be distinct languages.

It should not be confused with the Bembe language (Ibembe) spoken in Congo-Kinshasa and Tanzania.

References

External links
The Noun Phrase in Kibembe (D54)

Kongo language